Nesebar Municipality is a Bulgarian municipality comprising the northern part of the Black Sea coast of Burgas Province, Bulgaria. Its northern border is with the municipalities of Byala and Dolni Chiflik, its western border — with the municipality of Pomorie, and its eastern border is the Black Sea. Proximity to an international airport, as well as the long coastline and its diverse character create favourable conditions for the development of tourism. It is now the most popular tourist destination in the Balkan Peninsula and one of the most popular in Europe. There are 150 hotels with 70,000 beds, 35,000 beds in private accommodation, more than 1000 cafés and restaurants. The municipal centre is Nesebar, located 20 km from Burgas International Airport.

Towns and villages
The municipality consists of 3 towns and 11 villages:

Towns
 Nessebar
 Sveti Vlas
 Obzor

Villages
 Banya
 Gyulyovtsa
 Emona
 Koznitsa
 Kosharitsa
 Orizare
 Panitsovo
 Priseltsi
 Ravda
 Rakovskovo
 Tankovo

Demographics

Religion 
According to the latest Bulgarian census of 2011, the religious composition, among those who answered the optional question on religious identification, was the following:

References

External links

Municipalities in Burgas Province